Ramtown is a census-designated place and unincorporated community located within Howell Township, in Monmouth County, New Jersey, United States. As of the 2010 United States Census, the CDP's population was 6,242.

Geography
According to the United States Census Bureau, the CDP had a total area of 2.203 square miles (5.707 km2), including 2.192 square miles (5.678 km2) of land and 0.011 square miles (0.029 km2) of water (0.50%).

Demographics

Census 2010

Census 2000
As of the 2000 United States Census there were 5,932 people, 1,742 households, and 1,576 families living in the CDP. The population density was 1,111.8/km2 (2,873.0/mi2). There were 1,788 housing units at an average density of 335.1/km2 (866.0/mi2). The racial makeup of the CDP was 92.99% White, 2.02% African American, 0.02% Native American, 2.19% Asian, 1.48% from other races, and 1.30% from two or more races. Hispanic or Latino of any race were 6.20% of the population.

There were 1,742 households, out of which 60.9% had children under the age of 18 living with them, 80.3% were married couples living together, 7.5% had a female householder with no husband present, and 9.5% were non-families. 7.2% of all households were made up of individuals, and 1.5% had someone living alone who was 65 years of age or older. The average household size was 3.41 and the average family size was 3.60.

In the CDP the age distribution of the population shows 36.1% under the age of 18, 5.8% from 18 to 24, 35.8% from 25 to 44, 18.2% from 45 to 64, and 4.1% who were 65 years of age or older. The median age was 33 years. For every 100 females, there were 97.2 males. For every 100 females age 18 and over, there were 95.9 males.

The median income for a household in the CDP was $73,339, and the median income for a family was $74,125. Males had a median income of $57,429 versus $38,274 for females. The per capita income for the CDP was $23,042. About 2.8% of families and 3.1% of the population were below the poverty line, including 3.5% of those under age 18 and none of those age 65 or over.

Education

There are 3 public schools located within Ramtown, Ramtown Elementary, Greenville Elementary, and Howell Middle School South. Grenville school serves children grades K-2, Ramtown serves children grades 3–5, and Middle School South serves children grades 6–8. All 3 schools are located next to each other and all students are provided transportation. All students are not Ramtown residents, for example, students who live in the Newbury part of Howell are districted to attend Middle School South. After the completion of middle school, all Ramtown students are districted to go to Howell High School, located in Farmingdale, Howell, New Jersey. If HHS is not a favorable option for students and parents, students are given the option to join a program and attend one of the several other high schools a part of the Freehold Regional High School District.

See also
 The village of Adelphia in Howell Township, New Jersey
 The village of Allaire in Wall Township, New Jersey
 The village of Allenwood in Wall Township, New Jersey
 The Cassville Crossroads Historic District in Jackson Township, New Jersey
 The village of Cookstown in North Hanover Township, New Jersey
 Leisure Village East in Lakewood Township, New Jersey
 Leisure Village West in Manchester Township, New Jersey
 The village of New Egypt in Plumsted Township, New Jersey
 The village of Ocean Grove in Neptune Township, New Jersey
 The village of Whiting in Manchester Township, New Jersey

References

Neighborhoods in Howell Township, New Jersey
Census-designated places in Monmouth County, New Jersey